Vuyyuru mandal is one of the 25 mandals in Krishna district of the Indian state of Andhra Pradesh. It is under the administration of Vuyyuru revenue division and the headquarters are located at Vuyyuru town. The mandal is bounded by Kankipadu, Unguturu, Thotlavalluru, Pedaparupudi and Pamidimukkala mandals. The mandal is also a part of the Andhra Pradesh Capital Region under the jurisdiction of APCRDA.

Towns and villages 

 census, the mandal has 13 villages.

The settlements in the mandal are listed below:

See also 
List of villages in Krishna district

References

Mandals in Krishna district